Baker's Art Gallery was a photography studio in Columbus, Ohio from 1862 to 1955. Among those to have their portraits taken were Kyrle Bellew, William McKinley, Rutherford B. Hayes, and Annie Oakley. They also won first place at various exhibitions, including the World's Columbian Exhibition.

Background

Lorenzo Marvin Baker was born April 25, 1834, in Copenhagen, New York, and came to Columbus, Ohio in 1854. He worked at the Neil House Hotel, and was an officer in the state penitentiary under Governor Chase, and served for a short time in the Union Army during the American Civil War. In 1862 he started a photography business and established a gallery. 

Baker took on his employee, John Samuel Schneider, (1860 - 1926), and his son, Duane Henry Baker, (1859 - 1934), as equal 1/3 partners in the business after the younger Baker graduated from Ohio State University and Schneider from Baldwin-Wallace College. They ran a highly successful business that included Presidents Hayes, McKinley, Taft, and Harding as clients. After the founder died in 1924, Duane Baker continued the business. Two more generations of the Baker family continued the business until 1955, when they donated their photos and negatives to the Ohio Historical Society.

Locations
The gallery was located at 106 S. High Street, and later moved to 232 S. High Street. They moved to another location after 1939.

Awards
John S. Schneider was president of the Photographers Association of America in 1895. The gallery won the Photographers Association of America Gold Medal in 1889, Chicago Worlds Fair, Highest Award, 1893, Photographer's Association of Germany, grand prize, 1897 and awards at the Ohio State Fair, beginning in 1874, for photographs plain and finished with watercolor and ink.

References

Photographic studios
Buildings in downtown Columbus, Ohio
Photography companies of the United States
Culture of Columbus, Ohio
1862 establishments in Ohio
1955 disestablishments in Ohio
American companies established in 1862
American companies disestablished in 1955
19th-century American photographers
20th-century American photographers
19th century in Columbus, Ohio
20th century in Columbus, Ohio